Tasiusaq Island (old spelling: Tasiussaq) is an island in Avannaata municipality in northwestern Greenland, home to the Tasiusaq settlement.

Geography 
Tasiusaq Island is located in the outer belt of islands in Tasiusaq Bay, in the central part of Upernavik Archipelago. In the northwest, the Ikerasak Strait separates it from Uigorlersuaq Island. The inner waterways of the bay separate it from Aappilattoq Island and Anarusuk Island in the northeast. The Simiuttap Ikerasaa strait, with a small skerry in the middle separates Tasiusaq from the mountainous Qaqaarissorsuaq Island in the east. The outer waterways of Tasiusaq Bay separate the island from small skerries and Kangaarsuk Island in the south, from Illunguit Island in the southwest, and from Paagussat Island in the west.

Tasiusaq Island is mountainous in its center. The Tasiusaq village is located in the lower part of the island, at the shores of one of the small bays indenting the coastline in the northwest, near Nuunnguaq, the western cape.

Promontories

References

Tasiusaq Bay
Islands of the Upernavik Archipelago